Niobium carbide (NbC and Nb2C) is an extremely hard refractory ceramic material, commercially used in tool bits for cutting tools. It is usually processed by sintering and is a frequent additive as grain growth inhibitor in cemented carbides. It has the appearance of a brown-gray metallic powder with purple lustre. It is highly corrosion resistant.

Synthesis
Niobium carbide can be produced by the heating of niobium oxide in a vacuum at 1800 °C and adding coke.

Properties and uses
Niobium carbide has a Young's modulus of approximately 452 GPa, and a shear modulus of 182 GPa.  It has a Poisson's ratio of 0.227.

Niobium carbide is a frequent intentional product in microalloyed steels due to its extremely low solubility product in austenite, the lowest of all the refractory metal carbides. This means that micrometre-sized precipitates of NbC are virtually insoluble in steels at all processing temperatures and their location at grain boundaries helps prevent excessive grain growth in these steels. This is of enormous benefit, and the cornerstone of microalloyed steels, because it is their uniform, very fine grain size that ensures both toughness and strength. The only commonly occurring compound with a lower solubility and hence, greater potential for restricting the grain growth of steels is titanium nitride.

Depending on grain size, niobium carbide may burn at 200-800 °C in air. A layer of niobium carbide can be created by chemical vapor deposition. Zirconium carbide and niobium carbide can be used as refractory coatings in nuclear reactors.

Natural occurrence
Niobocarbide - the naturally occurring form of niobium carbide - shall be regarded as an extremely rare mineral.

References

Carbides
Niobium(IV) compounds
Superhard materials
Refractory materials
Rock salt crystal structure